Jerome Mazzaro (born November 25, 1934 Detroit, Michigan) was an American editor, and poet.

He graduated from Wayne State University with a A.B. in 1954, and with a Ph.D. in 1963, and from the University of Iowa with a M.A. in 1956.

He worked as a technical writer for General Motors from 1955 to 1956.
He taught at the University of Detroit from 1958 to 1961, and at the State University of New York at Cortland from 1962 to 1964, and at the University at Buffalo, The State University of New York.

He edited Fresco from 1960 to 1961, and Modern Poetry Studies from 1970 to 1979.
He was assistant editor for North American Review from 1963 to 1965, and Noetics from 1964 to 1965.
He contributed to Salmagundi, American Poetry Review, and Helios.

Awards
 1964 Guggenheim Fellowship

Works
 The Achievement of Robert Lowell: 1939-1959 (1960)
 The Poetic Themes of Robert Lowell University of Michigan Press, 1965
 Transformations in the Renaissance English lyric, Cornell University Press, 1970, 
 Modern American poetry: essays in criticism, Editor Jerome Mazzaro, D. McKay Co., 1970
 William Carlos Williams: The Later Poetry Cornell University Press, 1973
 Postmodern American poetry, University of Illinois Press, 1980, 
 The Figure of Dante (1981)

Translations
Satires, Authors Juvenal, Editor Richard Emil Braun, Translated Jerome Mazzaro, University of Michigan Press, 1965

Poetry
 Changing the Windows University Press, 1966

Anthologies
"Lullaby; Early Afternoon, Chautaugua", From the margin: writings in Italian Americana, Editors Anthony Julian Tamburri, Paolo Giordano, Fred L. Gardaphé, Purdue University Press, 2000, 
"The Caves of Love", Wild Dreams: The Best of Italian Americana, Editors Carol Bonomo Albright, Joanna Clapps Herman, Fordham Univ Press, 2008, 
"Yvonne Winters and In Defense of Reason", The Critics who made us: essays from Sewanee review, Editor George Core, University of Missouri Press, 1993,

References

External links
"The Caves of Love", The great American poetry bake-off], Author	Robert Peters, Rowman & Littlefield, 1991, 
Evory, Ann. Contemporary Authors. New Revision Series, Volume 6. Detroit: Gale Research Company, 1982. pp. 481–483.
Metzger, Linda (ed.). Contemporary Authors. New Revision Series, Volume 13. Detroit: Gale Research Company, 1984. pp. 353–354.

American male poets
1934 births
Writers from Detroit
Wayne State University alumni
University of Iowa alumni
University of Detroit Mercy faculty
Living people
University at Buffalo faculty
American editors
General Motors people